These are the international rankings of Slovakia.

International rankings
 Human Development Index 2018: Rank 38th out of 189 countries
 Index of Economic Freedom 2017: Rank 57th out of 180 countries
 Reporters Without Borders' Worldwide Press Freedom Index 2018: Rank 27th out of 180 countries
 Global Competitiveness Report 2018–2019: Rank 41st out of 140 countries
 Corruption Perceptions Index 2018: 57th out of 180 countries
 Democracy Index 2018: Rank 44th out of 167 countries
 Environmental Performance Index 2018: Rank 28th out of 180 countries
 Global Peace Index 2018: Rank 22nd out of 163 countries
 Programme for International Student Assessment 2015: Rank 38th out of 73 jurisdictions

Slovakia